Shibil Muhammed (born 23 January 1998) is an Indian footballer from Malappuram, Kerala, who currently plays for Bengaluru United .

Career

Gokulam Kerala FC
In August 2019, Muhammed was promoted from reserve to Gokulam Kerala FC for their Durand Cup squad by coach Santiago Valera. He made his senior debut in durand cup and scored one goal against Air Force . Shibil made his I league debut in a 2–3 loss against Chennai City as a substitute. Muhammed scored 2 goals in that match.

Career statistics

Honours

Club
Gokulam Kerala FC
 Durand Cup: 2019
 I-League
 Champions (1): 2020–21

References

Living people
Indian footballers
People from Malappuram
Footballers from Kerala
Association football midfielders
Gokulam Kerala FC players
1998 births
I-League players
Sreenidi Deccan FC players